The Turkish Academy of Sciences ( – TÜBA) is an autonomous scholarly association aimed at promoting scientific activities in Turkey. Although it is attached to the office of the Prime Minister and is largely funded by the government, it maintains financial and administrative autonomy. The academy is headquartered in Ankara.

In addition to conferring awards and fellowships to distinguished scientists, the academy is also responsible with determining scientific priority areas and proposing policies and needed changes in legislation to the government. The implementation and management of actual research programmes is carried out by TUBITAK.

Traditionally, the academy elected its own members, but beginning in November 2011 one third of the members are assigned by the Council of Ministers and one third are assigned by TUBITAK. Rest of the members are elected by the owners of the academy. As a response, 70 of the existing members of the academy resigned and founded another association, The Science Academy Society of Turkey. Its current president is Ahmet Cevat ACAR who is a professor in business academics and the former vice rector of the Istanbul University.

See also
 Scientific and Technological Research Council of Turkey (TÜBİTAK)

References

External links
 Official website (Turkish and English)

 
Scientific organizations established in 1993
National academies of sciences
Scientific organizations based in Turkey
1993 establishments in Turkey
Organizations based in Ankara
Members of the International Science Council